Gerald McCormick  is a Republican party politician in Tennessee, representing the 26th District as State Representative. His district includes parts of Hamilton County, Tennessee.

Biography
Gerald McCormick was born on February 22, 1962. He is a graduate of the University of Tennessee. He served in the Gulf War. He works as a real estate broker.

He serves on the Board of Directors of Blood Assurance. He is a member of the Kappa Alpha Order, National Rifle Association, the Veterans of Foreign Wars, the American Legion, and the Harrison Ruritan. He was a board member of the Chattanooga Jaycees, and president of the Pachyderm Club.

He is a Methodist. He is married with two children.

References

1962 births
Living people
University of Tennessee alumni
Members of the Tennessee House of Representatives
21st-century American politicians
Politicians from Chattanooga, Tennessee